Area codes 508 and 774 are telephone area codes in the North American Numbering Plan (NANP) for the U.S. state of Massachusetts. The numbering plan area comprises south-central and most of southeastern Massachusetts (LATA code 128). It includes Worcester, Outer south and southwest Greater Boston (such as the MetroWest region), as well as Fall River, New Bedford, Cape Cod, Martha's Vineyard, and Nantucket.

History
Massachusetts was originally divided into two numbering plan areas, when AT&T initiated the development of the North American Numbering Plan in 1947. Area code 617 was assigned to the eastern two-thirds of Massachusetts from roughly the western end of Worcester County to Boston, The Cape and Islands, and the South Coast, while the western part received area code 413.

Area code 508 was created on July 16, 1988, in a split from 617, with a semicircle around Boston retaining 617 and the northern, western, and southern parts of the area becoming 508. Permissive dialing of 617 and 508 continued until January 1, 1989.

On September 1, 1997, numbering plan area 508 was split, whereby area code 978 was assigned to the northern part of the service area.

Area code 774 was added to the 508 numbering plan area on May 2, 2001, forming an overlay complex and making ten-digit dialing mandatory for all local calls.

Some mobile telephone numbers assigned in the 1990s in communities in the former northern half of 508 (now the 978 area code) kept the area code after it split.

As of 2018, NPA 508/774 is projected to be exhausted by 2045.

Service area
The numbering plan area of area codes 508 and 774 includes the southern parts of the regions of Worcester County and MetroWest, as well as Cape Cod, Martha's Vineyard, Nantucket, and the South Coast.

The major towns and cities are Attleboro, Barnstable, Bridgewater, Brockton, Dartmouth, Fall River, Framingham, Franklin, New Bedford, Plymouth, Taunton, and Worcester.

See also
List of area codes in Massachusetts
List of NANP area codes

References

External links

 Massachusetts Area Code Map, Mass. Department of Telecommunications and Cable
List of exchanges from AreaCodeDownload.com, 508 Area Code
List of exchanges from AreaCodeDownload.com, 774 Area Code

508
508